The Benjamin Hibbard Residence is a historic house at 5-7 Gerry Street in Stoneham, Massachusetts, United States.  It is one of a few well-preserved 19th-century double houses in Stoneham.  The two-story wood-frame house was built c. 1850, and features double brackets along its cornice, pilastered corners, and a decorated porch covering the twin entrances in the center of the main facade.  The house is typical of modest worker residences built at that time.  Its only well-documented occupant, Benjamin Hibbard, was a carriage driver in the 1870s and 1880s.

The house was listed on the National Register of Historic Places in 1984.

See also
John Steele House (Stoneham, Massachusetts), another double house in Stoneham
National Register of Historic Places listings in Stoneham, Massachusetts
National Register of Historic Places listings in Middlesex County, Massachusetts

References

Houses in Stoneham, Massachusetts
Houses on the National Register of Historic Places in Stoneham, Massachusetts
Italianate architecture in Massachusetts
Houses completed in 1850